Point Pleasant was a railway station on the Riverside Branch, which ran between Byker and Willington Quay. The station served Willington Quay in North Tyneside.

The station was opened as an unadvertised halt on 1 October 1898 by the North Eastern Railway. It was later opened to the public on 1 January 1902.

This area of Wallsend was a hive of activity, and included many famous shipbuilders, such as the Wallsend Slipway and Engineering Company. The station was modest, with just two platforms and an iron lattice bridge of the standard North Eastern Railway design. Both platforms had a waiting room, with the booking office situated on the down platform.

History 
The Newcastle and North Shields Railway received Royal Assent on 21 June 1836, with the line opening between Carliol Square and North Shields on 18 June 1839. It ran along the north bank of the River Tyne, although due to the meandering course of the river, it ran some distance from the shoreline at the eastern end.

The branch line, which was designed to more closely follow the shoreline of the Tyne, serving the rapidly developing industries and communities, was authorised in 1871. It was built along a route "that consisted for the most part of tunnels, bridges, cuttings, retaining-walls, and embankments".

The branch line opened on 1 May 1879. The delay in opening the line reflected the scale of the engineering works required to build the many tunnels, cuttings and retaining walls. Despite being a loop line, the line was officially known as the Riverside Branch.

In the early 1900s, tramway competition caused a rapid decline in the number of passengers using the North Eastern Railway's local services in North Tyneside. Therefore, in 1904, the branch line was electrified, using a 600 V DC third-rail system.

Demise and closure 
Between 1909 and 1948, an hourly all-day service ran on the line. In the late 1940s, passenger services on the branch were reduced to peak hours only, catering primarily for commuter traffic from the shipyards along the River Tyne.

The station's goods facilities closed on 11 July 1967. During this time, the line was de-electrified in 1967, and converted to diesel multiple unit operation. By the early 1970s, traffic on the line had dwindled.

The last passenger train operated from Point Pleasant on 20 July 1973, with the branch line officially closing to passengers three days later.

References

External links

Railway stations in Great Britain opened in 1898
Railway stations in Great Britain closed in 1973
Former North Eastern Railway (UK) stations
Disused railway stations in Tyne and Wear
1973 disestablishments in England
Beeching closures in England